The Thirtieth Legislature of the Territory of Hawaii was the final session of the Hawaii Territorial Legislature.  The session convened in Honolulu, Hawaii, and ran from February 18 until May 2, 1959. This was the first session to comprise 25 senators and 51 representatives, avoiding potential equal representation which occurred in the House of Representatives during the 24th Hawaii Territorial Legislature.

Legislative session
The session ran from February 18 until May 2, 1959. It passed 279 bills into law.

Senators

House of Representatives

References

Notes

Hawaii legislative sessions